Lion dog may refer to:

 Chinese guardian lions, traditional Chinese architectural ornament known in colloquial English as lion dogs

Dog breeds
 African Lion Dog or Rhodesian Ridgeback, bred for hunting lions
 Chow Chow, also known as "Puffy-Lion Dog"
 Leonberger, also known as the "Gentle Lion"
 Lhasa Apso, a Tibetan breed of dog in the toy group
 Little Lion Dog or Löwchen, a small non-sporting dog
 Maltese Lion Dog, a breed of companion dog originating in Malta
 Pekingese, a Chinese breed of companion dog
 Shih Tzu or Chinese Lion Dog, a breed of dog in the toy group
 Tibetan terrier, a Tibetan breed of dog named after its resemblance to terriers
 Saluki

See also
 Foo Dog (disambiguation)
 Komainu, Japanese statues resembling Chinese guardian lions
 Shisa, Okinawan statues derived from Chinese guardian lions